The Scottish Parliamentary Standards Commissioner Act 2002 is legislation that introduced arrangements for complaints against any Member of the Scottish Parliament to be investigated independently. It established the Scottish Parliamentary Standards Commissioner, who was given powers to summon witnesses and compel evidence.

History
Parliament's Standards Committee published a bill to establish its own Standards Commissioner. The bill was introduced to Parliament on 4 February 2002. The bill set out that the commissioner would have the statutory power to summon witnesses and to compel the production of evidence.

The legislation was passed on 27 June 2002. It received Royal Assent on 30 July 2002.

Transfer of powers
The Scottish Parliamentary Commissions and Commissioners etc. Act 2010 transferred the powers to the Commissioner for Ethical Standards in Public Life in Scotland. The post was abolished by The Public Services Reform (Commissioner for Ethical Standards in Public Life in Scotland etc.) Order 2013 (Scottish Statutory Instrument 2013/197).

References

External links
 Session 1 Bills: Scottish Parliamentary Standards Commissioner Act 2002 at www.parliament.scot

Acts of the Scottish Parliament 2003